The Chapleau River is a river in Algoma District and Sudbury District in northeastern Ontario, Canada. It is in the James Bay drainage basin, begins at Chapleau Lake and is the main tributary of Kapuskasing Lake.

Etymology
The community of Chapleau was created as a divisional point during the construction of the Canadian Pacific Railway Transcontinental railway and was named for Joseph-Adolphe Chapleau. Both the lake upon which the community is located and the river which flows from the lake took on the same name.

Course
The river begins at the north end of Chapleau Lake in Subury District, and flows north through Henderson Lake before taking in the left tributary Racine Creek. it continues north to Schewabik Lake where it takes in the left tributary Swanson River. It continues northeast, then north, takes in the left tributary Makonie River, enters Algoma District, and reaches its mouth at Kapuskasing Lake. Kapuskasing Lake flows via the Kapuskasing River, the Mattagami River and the Moose River to James Bay.

Recreation
Chapleau-Nemegosenda River Provincial Park is a waterway park operated by Ontario Parks that includes the Chapleau River from the entry of the tributary Racine Creek to the river mouth at Kapuskasing Lake.

Tributaries
Makonie River (left)
Copperfield Creek (right)
Swanson River (left)
Adams Creek (right)
Racine Creek (left)
Chapleau Lake
Kebsquasheshing River

References

Sources

Rivers of Algoma District
Rivers of Sudbury District